The 1955 UK & Ireland Greyhound Racing Year was the 30th year of greyhound racing in the United Kingdom and Ireland.

Roll of honour

Summary
Spanish Battleship became the greatest greyhound in Irish history by securing a third consecutive Irish Greyhound Derby title. No other greyhound had managed to win more than one Irish Derby previously. Before retiring, he broke the track record at Cork during his Laurels victory and won another McCalmont Cup title. His connections turned down a £15,000 bid from a London syndicate. Rushton Mac defeated the versatile and hot favourite Barrowside in the English Greyhound Derby final.

Competitions
Barrowside dominated the Grand National at White City, the red fawn dog claimed a five length victory at odds of 1-3 in a track record time of 29.43. The Gold Collar at Catford Stadium was won by Firgrove Slipper, a competition that featured 1953 English Greyhound Derby champion Daws Dancer.

The new Derby champion Rushton Mac won the Welsh Greyhound Derby at Cardiff Arms Park, winning the final by nine lengths, flattering because the race turned into chaos as three runners fell. Derby finalists Gulf of Honduras and Coolkill Chieftain finished second and third respectively. The Scottish Greyhound Derby was cancelled again, denying Rushton Mac the opportunity to win the Triple Crown. He had won the Scottish event in 1954 to hold all three titles at the same time but had not won all three during the same year.

Rushton Mac completed a successful year by defending his Northern Flat and Edinburgh Cup titles. Duet Leader also had a great year winning the Laurels at Wimbledon Stadium, the Pall Mall Stakes, Select Stakes and Grand Prix at Walthamstow Stadium.

Lizette won the Oaks, two years after her first triumph and her half brother Gulf of Darien won the Cesarewitch.

News
Wandsworth Stadium hurdle grader, Moyshna Queen starred alongside Frankie Howerd in a film called Jumping for Joy. The bitch was called Lindy Lou in the film.

In November the Greyhound Racing Association (GRA) applied for a special licence to allow Spanish Battleship to line up against two of England's leading greyhounds, Duet Leader and Hi There, in a triangular match race. The match saw the GRA put up £120, in addition to the three owners adding 125 guineas; Spanish Battleship (Tim O'Connor), Duet Leader (Mrs Frances Chandler) and Hi There (Jack McAllister). Home Straight stood as reserve. The legendary Irish hound Spanish Battleship travelled to England for the first time with White City as his destination but age and the travelling had caught up with him, because home track advantage proved decisive and he trailed in third. Tom Lynch and Tim O'Connor retired him to stud.

Principal UK races

+Track Record

	

+Track Record

References 

Greyhound racing in the United Kingdom
Greyhound racing in the Republic of Ireland
UK and Ireland Greyhound Racing Year
UK and Ireland Greyhound Racing Year
UK and Ireland Greyhound Racing Year
UK and Ireland Greyhound Racing Year